Silicon Integrated Systems (SiS) is a company that manufactures, among other things, motherboard chipsets. The company was founded in 1987 in Hsinchu Science Park, Taiwan.

Business
In the late 1990s, SiS made the decision to invest in their own chip fabrication facilities. At the end of 1999, SiS acquired Rise Technology and its mP6 x86 core technology.

Mainboard chipsets

One of the most famous chipsets produced by SiS was the late 486-age chipset 496/497 which supported PCI bus among older ISA- and VLB-buses. Mainboards using this chipset and equipped with CPUs such as the Intel 80486DX4, AMD 5x86 or Cyrix Cx5x86 processors had performance and compatibility comparable with early Intel Pentium systems in addition to a lower price.

After this late success, SiS continued positioning itself as a budget chipset producer. The company emphasized high integration to minimize the cost to implement their solutions. As such, SiS one-chip mainboard chipsets that included integrated video, such as the Socket 7-based SiS 5596, SiS 5598, and SiS 530 along with the Slot 1-based SiS 620. These were some of the first PC chipsets with such high integration. They allowed entire system solutions to be built with just a mainboard, system RAM, and a CPU.

386 & 486 (Socket 1, 2, 3)
 SiS 310,320,330 "Rabbit"
 SiS 401/402 ISA
 SiS 406/411 EISA, Vesa Local Bus
 SiS 460 ISA, Vesa Local Bus
 SiS 461 ISA, Vesa Local Bus
 SiS 471 ISA, Vesa Local Bus
 SiS 496/497 ISA, VLB, PCI

Pentium (Socket 4,5,7)

SiS 501/502/503 ISA, PCI
SiS 5511/5512/5513 ISA, PCI
SiS 5571 ISA, PCI
SiS 5581/5582 ISA, PCI
SiS 5591/5595 ISA, PCI, AGP
The SiS 530 (Sindbad) with SiS 5595 southbridge supported Socket 7, SDRAM 1.5GB max., a bus frequency from 66 MHz to 124 MHz, and can have from 2 to 8 MiB shared memory for an integrated AGP SiS 6306 2D/3D graphics controller. Includes integrated UDMA66 IDE controller. mainboards using the SiS 530 were positioned as cheap office platforms and paired often with low-cost chips from Intel competitors, such as the AMD K6 series or Cyrix 6x86. The graphics controller had Direct3D 6.0 and OpenGL support, although it was a very low-performance product for 3D acceleration.

SiS 540 (Spartan) integrates SiS 300 graphics controller.

Socket 370, Slot 1
 SiS 600/SiS 5595
 SiS 620/SiS 5595
 SiS 630 - includes North- and South bridges (SiS 960) and 2D/3D graphics controller (SiS 305) on one chip
 SiS 633
 SiS 635

Socket 478, Socket 775
SiS and ALi were the only two companies initially awarded licenses to produce third party chipsets for the Pentium 4. SiS developed the 648 chipset with this license (SiS 648 B Stepping supports Intel Hyper-Threading CPU on some motherboards like MSI 648 Max).

Socket A (Socket 462), Slot A

Socket 940, 754, 939, AM2
Memory support is dependent on the CPU
SiS created a multimedia chipset for the Xbox 360.

Southbridge chips

Paired with later SiS chipsets, such as the 661GX/761GX, which adopt a standard two-chip chipset design (instead of single-chip, like the older SiS 630/730 series chipsets). SiS southbridges can handle IDE, LAN (accompanied by a PHY chip), audio (with an AC'97 codec), along with other types of I/O. SiS' proprietary MuTIOL interconnect connects the southbridge chip to the northbridge, which contains the RAM controller (for chipsets targeted at Intel platforms) and interfaces with the CPU.

Graphics chipsets
 SiS 6201
 SiS 6202
 SiS 6205
 SiS 6215
 SiS 6225
 SiS 6306
 SiS 6326
 SiS 300
 SiS 301
 SiS 305
 SiS 315
 SiS 320 (Xabre 80)
 SiS 326
 SiS 330 (Mirage IGP)
 SiS 340 (Xabre 200)
 SiS 360 (Xabre 400)
 SiS 380 (Xabre 600)

Discrete 3D Graphics chips

Integrated 3D Graphics 

 1Pixel shaders: vertex shaders: texture mapping units: render output units

Some cards contain a 3D graphics accelerator but it is only functional with the SiS's Proprietary Windows-only driver  (the company does not provide  documentation for others to write drivers). However, the Linux kernel includes a working third party driver that, while not supporting 3D gaming, makes the cards usable under Linux.

Touch-Screen chipsets
 SiS 9202
 SiS 9203
 SiS 9220P
 SiS 9223
 SiS 9250
 SiS 9250H
 SiS 9251
 SiS 9252
 SiS 9255
 SiS 9272
 SiS 9275
 SiS 9277

See also
 List of companies of Taiwan

References

External links 

 

1987 establishments in Taiwan
Manufacturing companies based in Hsinchu
Electronics companies established in 1987
Electronics companies of Taiwan
Graphics hardware companies
Semiconductor companies of Taiwan
Taiwanese brands